The Kay Bailey Hutchison Convention Center (KBHCCD) (formerly Dallas Convention Center) is a convention center in the Convention Center District of downtown Dallas, Texas.

The "Dallas Memorial Auditorium" was a standalone multipurpose arena, designed by George Dahl in 1957. Dahl was responsible for the renowned Art Deco buildings at the Dallas Fair Park, as well as many other Texas landmarks. The Convention Center additions were designed by Larry Oltmanns, who was a Design Partner with Skidmore, Owings and Merrill at the time.

On February 9, 2022, the Dallas City Council voted to take steps toward demolishing the convention center and replacing it with a new one.

About 

A  column-free exhibit hall is the largest of its kind in the United States. It is annually used for the Dallas Auto Show.

The east side of the structure contains the original element of the Dallas Memorial Auditorium, a 9,816-seat arena. The complex also houses a 1,740-seat theater, 105 meeting rooms, and two gigantic ballrooms.

In May 2009, voters approved the construction of the Omni Dallas Convention Center Hotel, a 1,000 room hotel that is attached to the Convention Center. It opened in late 2011, under budget and ahead of schedule.

History 
The Dallas Memorial Auditorium was originally constructed in 1957 near the intersection of Canton and Akard Streets. While the auditorium still hosts many smaller events, its antiquated facilities and technology, along with the fact that it is not compliant with the Americans with Disabilities Act, have kept it less busy than in the past. In 1973, the center was expanded and renamed the Dallas Convention Center; the expansion was designed by local architects Omniplan. The most-recent addition to the facility was completed in 2002. The complex was renamed in honor of former US Senator Kay Bailey Hutchison in 2013.

Notable tenants and events 
The venue was once home of the Dallas Chaparrals/Texas Chaparrals of the American Basketball Association, who played in Dallas from the 1967-68 season through the 1972-73 season. The team moved to San Antonio in 1973 and became the San Antonio Spurs.

On August 22, 1973, The Jackson 5 held a concert in the auditorium. While on a five city tour in the final week of 1976, Elvis Presley performed at the Dallas Convention Center on December 28. The concert was recorded and later released on the Follow That Dream collectors label with the title of Showtime! On April 1, 1977, Led Zeppelin opened what would become their last American tour together in the Dallas Memorial Auditorium, their sixth time performing at the venue. In October 1978, Queen played at the Convention Center during their US tour, and the music video for "Fat Bottomed Girls" was filmed at the center. Prince had two concerts at the venue: once in 1981 and again in 2000. Other performers who held concerts here include: Madonna, James Brown, The Beatles, The Rolling Stones, The Who, Jimi Hendrix, The Doors, Grateful Dead, Black Sabbath, Bruce Springsteen, David Bowie, Billy Joel, Kansas, Thin Lizzy, and Elvis Costello.

The Dallas Convention Center was the site of the 1984 Republican National Convention. President Ronald Reagan accepted the nomination for a second term there on Aug. 23, 1984.

Together with Reunion Arena, the center was an emergency shelter for thousands of Hurricane Katrina refugees in September 2005. KBH Was used again during Hurricane Harvey 2017.

Beginning in 2014, the center became the venue for Fan Expo Dallas.

From March 31 to April 3, 2016, WWE hosted the WrestleMania Axxess convention at the center, as part of the lead-up to WrestleMania 32 at AT&T Stadium in Arlington. As part of the event, it also hosted NXT TakeOver: Dallas on April 1.

On August 17, 2019, Y. S. Jaganmohan Reddy, the Chief Minister of Andhra Pradesh, addressed l Non-resident Indians.

Starting in April 2021 and running through April 2024 the annual VEX Robotics Competition World Championships will return to the center. The VEX Robotics World Championship had been previously hosted at the center in 2009 and 2010.

Transportation and Access

The convention center offers a parking garage and three surface parking lots (Lots C and E). Public transportation is available with Amtrak and the Trinity Railway Express serving the Dallas Union Station to the northeast of the Convention Center.

One of the world's largest heliport/vertiport facilities sits atop the structure and 75 truck berths line its docks.

External links 
 World Class Memories: Virtual WCCW Tour - DALLAS MEMORIAL AUDITORIUM
 Vx3arch.com: "Larry Oltmanns and the Dallas Convention Center"
 Tshaonline.org: Dallas Convention Center

References 

Buildings and structures in Dallas
Convention centers in Texas
Downtown Dallas
Economy of Dallas
Skidmore, Owings & Merrill buildings
Tourist attractions in Dallas
Theatres in Texas
Music venues in Dallas
Music venues in Texas
Indoor arenas in Texas